This is a list of artists classified as recording folktronica, a genre of music comprising various elements of folk music and electronica; often incorporating hip hop, electronic or dance rhythms.

Folktronica artists

Alex G
alt-j
Aurora
Avicii
Ásgeir
 The Beta Band
 Beth Orton
 Bat for Lashes
 Bibio
 Björk
 Bon Iver
 The Books
 The Blue Nile
 Bunt (duo)
 Caribou (AKA Manitoba)
 Félix Lajkó
 Go_A
 Goldfrapp
 Ellie Goulding
 David Gray
 Detektivbyrån
 Inyal
 Jakokoyak
 Four Tet 
 Juana Molina
 KT Tunstall
 Maggie Rogers
 Mid-Air Thief
 Milky Chance
 Minute Taker
 Múm
 OOPUS
 Patrick Wolf
 Sylvan Esso
 Tunng
 James Yuill
 Wintergatan
 Yuko

References

Sources
Scott, Derek B. (editor), ''The Ashgate Research Companion to Popular Musicology (2016), 

 
Electronica
Folktronica